Vicente's poison frog (Oophaga vicentei) is a species of frog in the family Dendrobatidae that is endemic to the Veraguas and Coclé Provinces of central Panama. It is a little known arboreal frog that inhabits humid tropical lowland and montane forest.

Vicente's poison frog breeds in arboreal vegetation, and the parents transport the tadpoles to vegetation-bound water pools in bromeliads to develop. As the generic name Oophaga indicates, this and related species also practice a particular form of oophagy, where the mother deposits special nutritive eggs for the larvae to consume.

References

Oophaga
Amphibians of Panama
Endemic fauna of Panama
Amphibians described in 1996
Taxonomy articles created by Polbot